Mélanie Vogel, (born 22 May 1985 in Marseille) is a French academic and politician of Europe Ecology – The Greens (EELV) who has been serving as a member of the French Senate since 2021, representing the constituency of French citizens living abroad.

Early career
Vogel led the EÉLV campaign in the 2014 European elections and later worked as an advisor for the Greens–European Free Alliance group on constitutional affairs.

Political career
In the Senate, Vogel serves on the Committee on Social Affairs.

Vogel has been the co-chair of the European Green Party together with Thomas Waitz since 5 June 2022.

Personal life
Vogel is in a relationship with Terry Reintke. They live in Brussels.

References

1985 births
Living people
French LGBT politicians